A Bullfight is a fight between a bull and a man

Bullfight, or The Bullfight may also refer to:
Bullfight (Goya), 1824 painting by Goya 
The Bullfight, novelette by Yasushi Inoue 1949
Bullfight, play with music by Rolando Valdés-Blain
The Bullfight (La Course de taureaux, 1951) documentary film by Pierre Braunberger
"Bullfight", song by A Day to Remember from Bad Vibrations 2016